Andrew Bryan (1737–1812) founded Bryan Street African Baptist Church, affectionately called the Mother Church of Black Baptists, and First African Baptist Church of Savannah in Savannah, Georgia, the first black Baptist churches to be established in America. Bryan was the former slave of Jonathan Bryan.

Andrew Bryan was born in 1737 in Goose Creek, South Carolina, to slave parents. He married a woman named Hannah. Bryan converted to Christianity through the preaching of George Liele. After Liele left Savannah for a mission to Jamaica, Bryan began to preach. He was imprisoned twice for preaching to slaves, but he continued to do so. He was also severely whipped, but was noted for enduring the suffering as Jesus Christ had done. Bryan established the church which would eventually become known as First African Baptist Church, and it grew from sixty-nine members in 1788 to about seven hundred by 1800.

Origin and family
Andrew Bryan was born in 1737 in the small town of Goose Creek, South Carolina. Bryan  was born on a plantation called Brampton, owned by Jonathan Bryan. Brampton was known as a productive rice plantation. His father was a man named Caesar, who was a slave along with Bryan. He was a mixture of black and white. Andrew served as a coachman and a body servant to Jonathan.  Society for the Propagation of the Gospel in Foreign Parts (S.P.G.) was an organization that cared for British colonist  in religious matters and to support the religious needs of Indians and slaves. The S.P.G. organization influenced Bryan to become a religious leader. He had a brother by the name of Sampson Bryan. Hannah Bryan was the wife of Bryan. It was believed that he had a daughter as well.

The Beginning of Preaching 
While growing up on the plantation, Brampton, Bryan came across a man by the name of George Liele. Liele was the first African American to be ordained and the first to travel out of the country. Bryan and Liele became good friends and started preaching alongside each other. In 1783, Bryan and his wife were baptized along with some other slaves. Abraham Marshall and Jesse Peters baptized 45 people that followed Bryan's teachings. Those 45 people regularly organized then became his congregation. Bryan was then ordained and became the pastor of the first Baptist church of Savannah, Georgia. Sampson was the first deacon of the church. Bryan would preach along the Savannah River. Liele went away to Jamaica and Bryan took over the churches that Liele would preach at, which caused an expansion in Bryan's congregation. One of these locations was owned by a man named Edward Davis in Yamacraw. Edward Davis encouraged Bryan to build a religious place in the village of Yamacraw. The gatherings at the village of Yamacraw got so big that the white community thought it was a plot of rebellion.

Service Interruptions and Arrest 
Andrew Bryan became good at preaching that a lot of people were showing up to his services in the village of Yamacraw. The white community did not like that there were a lot of African American people gathering for Bryan's services. The slave masters did not want their slaves listening to Bryan because they believed that he was plotting a rebellion. The slaves that did attend the services were harassed by whites. The slaves were punished with whipping, shackling, hanging, beating, burning, and imprisonment.  The church services were interrupted constantly by the whites. Bryan was accused of plotting of a rebellion, so he was beaten and thrown in jail. Sampson was also thrown jail along with Bryan. Jonathan Bryan and other plantation owners protested the arrest of Andrew Bryan. The case was analyzed by Justice of the Inferior Court of Chatham County and it resulted in Bryan and Samson being found innocent and released. After they were released, Bryan went back preaching at Jonathan Bryan's barn from sunrise to sunset.

Expansion and ending 
While he was preaching in the barn on the Brampton plantation, Bryan's following continued to increase. Several prominent white males supported Bryan and his preachings. In 1788 the First Baptist Church got certified and Jonathan Bryan died and left Andrew Bryan 95 pound of sterling. Bryan used 50 pounds to buy his freedom from William Bryan, Jonathan Bryan's brother. On the first of June 1790 with 27 pounds of sterling he bought property from Thomas Gibbons that became a place for a new church. William Bryan and James Whitfield bought land for Bryan and his family to live on. In 1805 the first African Baptist church, Savannah Baptist church and Newington Baptist Church became Savannah River Baptist Association, contributions from Bryan allowed this to happen. Bryan pastored for 24 years and died at the age of 92 on October 6, 1812. He is interred in Whitefield Square in Savannah.

Notes

18th-century American slaves
African-American Baptist ministers
1737 births
1812 deaths
18th-century Baptist ministers from the United States
South Carolina colonial people